FedExField (originally Jack Kent Cooke Stadium) is an American football stadium located in Summerfield, Maryland,  east of Washington, D.C. The stadium is the home of the Washington Commanders of the National Football League (NFL). From 2004 until 2010, it had the largest seating capacity in the NFL at over 91,000. As of 2022, the capacity is 67,617. FedExField is in the Summerfield census-designated place and has a Landover postal address.

History

FedExField was built as a replacement for Washington's prior venue, Robert F. Kennedy Memorial Stadium in Washington, D.C. In 1994, Jack Kent Cooke sought to build a new stadium on the grounds adjacent to Laurel Park Racecourse along Whiskey Bottom and Brock Bridge roads. Lack of parking facilities and support prompted a second site selection. The land was previously Wilson dairy farm.

The stadium opened in 1997 as Jack Kent Cooke Stadium, in honor of the recently deceased owner of the team, and the stadium site was known as Raljon from the first names of Cooke's sons – "Ralph" and "John". Notably, Cooke was able to register Raljon with the United States Postal Service as a legal alternate address for the 20785 ZIP code of Landover, Maryland, where the stadium is located, and went to some lengths to require media to use Raljon in datelines from the stadium. This ended when Daniel Snyder bought the team from the Cooke estate, and the team now gives the stadium's address as Landover.

A special exit, Exit 16 (Arena Drive), was built from Interstate 495, the Capital Beltway.

After Snyder's purchase, the stadium's naming rights were sold to FedEx in November 1999 for an average of $7.6 million per year. The waiting list for season tickets was reportedly over 160,000 names long. However, according to The Washington Post, ticket office employees improperly sold tickets directly to ticket brokers for several years before the practice was discovered in 2009.

Although the team has never sold out the entire stadium, the team has not had a game blacked out on local television since 1972 (when home game broadcasts were banned outright) because it does not count "premium club level seating" when calculating sellouts (their sellout streak dates to 1965, eight years before the new blackout rules were implemented).

From 2004 to 2010, Washington’s fans set the NFL regular-season home paid attendance records. In 2005 the team drew a record 716,998 fans overall. The December 30, 2007, 27–6 win against the Dallas Cowboys was the most-watched game in franchise history, with 90,910 fans in the stands to see Washington clinch a playoff spot. The team led the NFL in attendance in 2000 and every year between 2002 and 2008.

On January 8, 2000, the Redskins defeated the Detroit Lions 27–13 in the first NFL playoff game at FedExField. On December 29, 2002, Washington defeated the rival Dallas Cowboys, 20–14. This game was Darrell Green's final game. He played 20 seasons with the team. The game also broke a 10-game losing streak to the Cowboys.

Design

The stadium has five levels – the Lower Level, the Club Level, the Lower and Upper Suite Levels, and the Upper Level. The Lower, Club, and Upper Levels are all named after important figures of the franchise, NFL, and Washington, D.C. area. The Lower Level is named "Bobby Mitchell Level", the Club is named "Joe Gibbs Club Level", and the Upper Level is called "Pete Rozelle Upper Level." The Suite Levels have 243 suite, lounge, and Owner's Club luxury boxes and 15,044 club seats. After Daniel Snyder purchased the team, five rows of "Dream Seats" were installed in front of what had been the first row of the lower level, extending down almost to the level of the field.

Notable events

College football

FedExField hosts the annual Prince George's Classic college football game, which is a game usually between two historically black universities. It has hosted several other college football games as well, including the 1998 game between the University of Notre Dame and the United States Naval Academy, the 2004 Black Coaches Association Classic between the University of Southern California Trojans and the Virginia Tech Hokies, and the 112th Army–Navy Game.

Soccer
FedExField is not well known as a soccer venue, as D.C. United of Major League Soccer elected to remain at RFK Stadium after the new stadium's opening. They began playing at Audi Field within the city in 2018.

FedExField has been used for some international soccer matches — both for the United States and also for El Salvador. On March 28, 2015, Argentina defeated El Salvador at FedExField before a crowd of 53,978. On June 7, 2014, the stadium hosted a doubleheader. Spain, the 2010 World Cup winner, defeated El Salvador 2–0 in a warm-up match in front of a crowd of 53,267 before the 2014 World Cup; in the other game of the doubleheader, D.C. United played Columbus Crew to a scoreless draw in D.C. United's first time hosting an MLS regular-season game at FedExField.

It hosted four preliminary matches and one quarterfinal doubleheader in the 1999 Women's World Cup. On July 1, 1999, the United States women's national soccer team defeated the German women's national team 3–2 in the FIFA Women's World Cup 1999 quarterfinals.

FedExField has also hosted a number of club soccer exhibition matches. During the July 2005 World Series of Football, D.C. United hosted Chelsea F.C. there; the 31,473 spectators represented D.C. United's third-highest ever home attendance. On August 9, 2009, D.C. United hosted another international friendly against Real Madrid at FedExField. On July 30, 2011, Manchester United ended its 2011 summer tour with a 2–1 win over F.C. Barcelona at FedExField in front of 81,807 fans. This represented the largest soccer crowd in D.C.-area history. FedExField was used on July 29, 2014, in the International Champions Cup as Manchester United played Inter Milan; the game ended in a 0-0 draw and the shootout was won by Manchester United 5-3. On July 26, 2017, Manchester United played F.C. Barcelona again at the FedExField as part of International Champions Cup. This time the Catalan club secured a narrow 1-0 victory over Manchester United in front of 80,162 fans, with Neymar's last goal for F.C. Barcelona being the difference. On August 4, 2018, FedExField hosted a 2018 International Champions Cup match between Real Madrid and Juventus. Real Madrid won 3-1. On July 23, 2019, FedExField also hosted a match between Real Madrid and Arsenal. The match ended 2-2, and Real Madrid won the penalty shootout.

FedExField was being considered as a 2026 FIFA World Cup venue and was up against 16 other venues around the United States, including M&T Bank Stadium in nearby Baltimore; with the final list of 10 stadiums to be decided in 2022. However on April 22, 2022, the stadium dropped out of the bidding process, the organizers having decided instead to merge their bid with Baltimore and move the region's games to M&T Bank Stadium, though fan activities would still have been staged on the National Mall. The Baltimore bid was ultimately rejected in the final round, making it the first time since 2002 that a World Cup match was not played in the capital city.

Rugby union
FedExField hosted a rugby union match between New Zealand and the USA Eagles on October 23, 2021. This was the first time a rugby union game has been hosted at FedExField. The Eagles lost 104–14 in front of a crowd of 39,720 people.

Concerts

The stadium has hosted several concerts, including the HFStival and George Strait Country Music Festival in 2000, the Rolling Stones with the Strokes in 2002 and with Ghost Hounds in 2019, Metallica with Deftones, Linkin Park, and Limp Bizkit in 2003, Bruce Springsteen also in 2003, Kenny Chesney, who performed in 2005, 2011, 2012, and 2013. U2 with Muse, as well as Paul McCartney with Thievery Corporation in 2009. U2 returned to the stadium in 2017 with The Lumineers. Guns N' Roses with Alice in Chains in 2016, Coldplay in 2017 and 2022, Taylor Swift performed two nights in 2018 as part of her Reputation Stadium Tour with Camila Cabello and Charli XCX. Beyoncé & Jay Z also performed two nights as part of the On the Run II Tour with Chloe x Halle and DJ Khaled. Childish Gambino and Lil Wayne performed in 2019 as part of the Broccoli City Festival. The Weeknd performed at the stadium on July 30, 2022, as part of his After Hours til Dawn Stadium Tour.

Criticisms

Many fans feel FedExField does not compare favorably with RFK Stadium, the team’s previous stadium. Sports Illustrateds rankings of "NFL Fan Value Experience" in 2007, rated FedExField 28th out of 31 NFL stadiums. In January 2007, The Washington Post reported that team owner Daniel Snyder was meeting with Washington, D.C., officials about building a new stadium in order to return the team to the District. There were also reportedly meetings with former Virginia Governor Terry McAuliffe. FedExField was rated as the worst stadium in the NFL in a 2022 poll.

Problems were created when Snyder veered from the original intended Cooke-era design of the stadium to maximize revenue. Over the years, "party zones" requiring paid membership (such as the Touchdown Club and Tailgate Club) have sprouted on the concourse outside the stadium. Entrances adjacent to the "party zones" are no longer accessible to fans who do not purchase a "party zone" membership. Installation of "Dream Seats" are another modification of the stadium that has increased revenue. The original architect calculated the lowest possible height at which the first row could be set in order to still see the field over the players standing on the sideline. In 2005, eight years after the stadium opened, 1,488 premium "dream seats" in three rows were added in front of what was the first row when the stadium was built. Because some of these seats are too low to see over the players on the sideline, occupants of these seats stand in order to see the game. In the 2011 off-season, nearly 10,000 seats were removed from the upper deck to reduce capacity to around 83,000, making FedExField the second-largest venue in the NFL during the 2011 season. A Redskins team official admitted that the seats were removed due to lack of demand. During the 2012 offseason, 4,000 additional seats were removed to make way for new suites and party decks and the stadium's capacity dropped to 79,000. The seats that were removed permit the team to continue to sell out and avoid the NFL television black-out rule. In December 2013, the Redskins set a record for the lowest announced attendance ever at FedExField with 56,247, most likely because of the team's poor record at the time and inclement weather. Attendance in the 2014 season averaged less than 78,000 per game, and never rose above 81,000. On June 1, 2015, The Washington Post reported that another 4,000 to 6,000 seats, primarily in the top eight rows of the upper decks, were tarped off using chain link fencing and tarps during the 2015 off-season. Team officials said the removals were made due to "season ticket holder feedback", and declined to say exactly how many seats had been removed.

The location of the stadium has made traveling to it through public transportation difficult, inconvenient, and time-consuming as residents and visitors in the region rely heavily on public transportation. The stadium is about a mile away from the Morgan Boulevard station, the nearest Metro station to the stadium. Furthermore, federal regulations prohibit publicly paid shuttle service from public transit agencies when a private service is available. Since private service is not cost-effective, fans taking public transportation must walk to and from the stadium.

In the 2021–22 NFL season, three separate incidents of water leaks occurred within close or direct proximity to fans. On January 2, 2022, after the conclusion of the game versus the Philadelphia Eagles, as Eagles quarterback Jalen Hurts was walking down the away team tunnel, a barrier separating seated fans from the away team tunnel gave way, causing several attendees to fall within close vicinity of the Eagles quarterback. According to several fans that were part of the incident, the staff on site did not show care or have medical attention come over; the only response was them yelling at the fans to “get the fuck off the field”. The team released a statement claiming they did have medical evaluations done on site, but that was denied by one of the fans. Another said that Jalen Hurts was the only one who asked if they were okay. Hurts later wrote an open letter on the incident to the Commanders (then known as the Washington Football Team) and the NFL on the incident, asking that action be taken to prevent an incident like this from happening again.

Notes and references

External links

FedExField at StadiumDB.com
FedEx.com site

Sports venues completed in 1997
Navy Midshipmen football venues
Soccer venues in Maryland
1999 FIFA Women's World Cup stadiums
National Football League venues
Buildings and structures in Prince George's County, Maryland
American football venues in Maryland
Washington Commanders stadiums
Washington Football Team stadiums
Washington Redskins stadiums
Music venues in Maryland
Tourist attractions in Prince George's County, Maryland
FedEx
1997 establishments in Maryland
Sports venues in the Washington metropolitan area